Aleksandr Aleksandrovich Serdyuk , also known as Les Serdyuk; October 14, 1940 in Kharkiv, Ukrainian SSR – May 26, 2010 in Kyiv, Ukraine) was a Soviet and Ukrainian theater and film actor. People's Artist of Ukraine (1996).

Biography 
Born into a family of People's Artist of the USSR Aleksandr Ivanovich Serdyuk.  In 1961 he graduated from Kharkiv National Kotlyarevsky University of Arts.

In 1961–1964 years - an actor of the Taras Shevchenko Kharkiv Academic Ukrainian Drama Theatre.
In 1964–1966 years - an actor of the Riga Youth Theatre.

In 1966-1970 - an actor Lesya Ukrainka National Academic Theater of Russian Drama. Since 1970, he starred in the Dovzhenko Film Studios.

In 2008, after a 37 year break, he returned to the stage as part of the troupe Ivan Franko National Academic Drama Theater.

Death
He died in 2010.

Selected filmography

1954: Marina's Destiny
1967: They knew only by sight - Bellavista
1968: In the Kyiv area - Mykhailo Burmystenko
1968: The Experiment of Dr. Abst - Bruno
1970: Sespel
1970: Khlib i sil - Maryan
1971: Zvyozdnyy tsvet - Trofim Kovalchuk
1971: More nashey nadezhdy
1972: Zhivaya voda - Anton Demyanovich
1972: Criminal Investigation Inspector
1972: Night rider - Savchenko
1972: Lavri - Tokovoy
1972: Adres vashego doma - Moldauer
1973: Chyornyy kapitan - Osip Zaburunnyy
1974: Abiturientka1974: Ogon - Svirid
1974: Duma o Kovpake: Nabat - Gulyavyy
1974: Reys pervyy, reys posledniy - Ivan
1978: Duma o Kovpake: Karpaty, Karpaty... - Gulyavyy
1978: Zestoke godine - Latyshev
1978: Lyubov i yarost1980: Vavilon XX - Danko
1980: Poezd chrezvychaynogo naznacheniya1981: Ot Buga do Visly - Moskalenko, zampolit
1981: U chertova logova - Balaban
1981: Takaya pozdnyaya, takaya tyoplaya osen1981: Pod svist pul1982: Preodoleniye - Ivan Lukich Vasilenko
1983: Zvyozdnaya komandirovka1983: Vnezapnyy vybros1983: Proval operatsii 'Bolshaya medveditsa' - Ren
1984: The Legend of Princess Olga - Prince Sviatoslav I
1984: Blagie namereniya1986: Poklonis do zemli1987: Poka est vremya - Iovan
1988: Solomiani dzvony1988: Poddannye revolyutsii1988: The Mountains are Smoking (TV Movie) - Martin Pogodnyak
1989: Seromanets1989: Nebilitsi Pro Ivana1990: Ne otstrelennaya muzyka - Valeriy
1991: The first printer Revelation - Garaburda
1991: Dikoe pole1992: Vverkh tormashkami - Beggar
1992: American Boy - waiter
1995: Stracheni svitanki1996: Operatsyya 'Kontrakt' - Polkovnyk Herasymenko
1997: Kazachya byl - Kost Verboloz
1997: Roksolana - Kasim Pasha
2000: Istota2002: A Prayer for Hetman Mazepa - Ivan Samoylovych
2009: Taras Bulba'' - Dmytro

References

External links

 Лесь Сердюк на сайте «Актёры советского кино»

1940 births
2010 deaths
Actors from Kharkiv
20th-century Ukrainian male actors
Soviet male film actors
Soviet male stage actors
Ukrainian male film actors
Ukrainian male stage actors
21st-century Ukrainian male actors
Recipients of the title of People's Artists of Ukraine
Burials at Baikove Cemetery